9,9'-dicis-zeta-carotene desaturase (zeta-carotene desaturase, ZDS) is an enzyme with systematic name 9,9'-dicis-zeta-corotene:quinone oxidoreductase. This enzyme catalyses the following chemical reaction

 9,9'-dicis-zeta-carotene + 2 quinone  7,9,7',9'-tetracis-lycopene + 2 quinol (overall reaction)
(1a) 9,9'-dicis-zeta-carotene + a quinone  7,9,9'-tricis-neurosporene + a quinol
(1b) 7,9,9'-tricis-neurosporene + a quinone  7,9,7',9'-tetracis-lycopene + a quinol

This enzyme is involved in carotenoid biosynthesis in plants and cyanobacteria.

References

External links 
 

EC 1.3.5